Mordellistena caledonica is a beetle in the genus Mordellistena of the family Mordellidae. It was described in 1905 by Fauv.

References

caledonica
Beetles described in 1905